Elections to the Shetland Islands Council took place on 5 May 2022 on the same day as the other Scottish local government elections. Seven wards will be contested, each ward electing two to four Councillors using the single transferable vote system form of proportional representation, with 23 Councillors elected.

The elections will be the first held since the passage of the Islands (Scotland) Act 2018 which allowed wards in Scottish councils containing islands to be reduced to single and dual member wards. As a result, the Shetland West ward was reduced from three members to two.

The Scottish Greens contested a Shetland Islands Council election for the first time, standing three candidates and electing one councillor in Shetland South.<ref name="Green candidates"  Scottish Labour elected its first councillor to the Shetland Islands Council since 1994.

Background

Composition
There were no changes to the political composition of the council following the election in 2017. Two by-elections were held and both were won by independents.

Retiring councillors

Boundary changes
Following the implementation of the Islands (Scotland) Act 2018, a review of the boundaries was undertaken in North Ayrshire, Argyll and Bute, Highland, Orkney Islands, Shetland Islands and Comhairle nan Eilean Siar. The act allowed for single- or two-member wards to be created to allow for better representation of island communities. 

As a result, the seven existing wards were retained with realigned boundaries but the number of councillors was increased from 22 to 23. Lerwick North was renamed Lerwick North and Bressay but was otherwise unchanged, as were North Isles and Shetland North. The boundaries were adjusted in the remaining wards which resulted in Shetland Central and Shetland South being increased from three- to four-member wards and Shetland West being reduced to a dual-member ward.

Uncontested Seats
After nominations closed on 30 March 2022, two wards – North Isles and Shetland North – didn't receive enough candidates to trigger an election. Both are three member wards and only five candidates stood in total. As a result, all five candidates were automatically elected without a poll being conducted and a by-election will be scheduled to fill the vacant North Isles seat. 

The lack of interest in standing for election was called a "threat to local democracy" by the Greens. Across Scotland, 18 councillors were automatically elected because the number of candidates was not enough to trigger an election. During the 2017 local elections in Scotland, just three council wards were uncontested but votes were held in every ward in both 2007 and 2012 – the first elections to use multi-member wards and the single transferable vote. Public disinterest in standing for election to local councils has been linked to the "ridiculous" size of some local authorities and the low pay councillors receive for their work.

Campaign
During the election campaign, candidates gave particular focus to the cost of living, housing and the proposed construction of fixed link tunnels.  A survey conducted by The Shetland Times prior to the election found highest support for the issues of fuel poverty, fixed links and digital connectivity as priorities for the new council.

Election results

Note: "Votes" are the first preference votes. The net gain/loss and percentage changes relate to the result of the previous Scottish local elections on 4 May 2017. This may differ from other published sources showing gain/loss relative to seats held at dissolution of Scotland's councils.

Ward summary

|- class="unsortable" align="center"
!rowspan=2 align="left"|Ward
! % 
! Cllrs
! %
! Cllrs
! %
! Cllrs
! %
! Cllrs
! %
! Cllrs
!rowspan=2|Totalcllrs
|- class="unsortable" align="center"
!colspan=2 bgcolor=""|Independents
!colspan=2 bgcolor=""|SNP
!colspan=2 bgcolor=""|Green
!colspan=2 bgcolor=""|Labour
!colspan=2 bgcolor="white"|Others
|-
|align="left"|North Isles
|
|2
|colspan=8 align="center" 
|2
|-
|align="left"|Shetland North
|
|2
|colspan=5 align="center" 
|1
|colspan=2 
|3
|-
|align="left"|Shetland West
|bgcolor=""|83.11
|bgcolor=""|2
|7.8
|0
|9.1
|0
|colspan=2 rowspan=5 
|colspan=2 
|2
|-
|align="left"|Shetland Central
|42.72
|2
|colspan=2 rowspan=3 
|7.0
|0
|bgcolor=""|50.29
|bgcolor=""|2
|4
|-
|align="left"|Lerwick North and Bressay
|bgcolor=""|100
|bgcolor=""|3
|colspan=2 rowspan=2 
|colspan=2 
|3
|-
|align="left"|Lerwick South
|bgcolor=""|92.11
|bgcolor=""|4
|7.8
|0
|4
|-
|align="left"|Shetland South
|bgcolor=""|73.34
|bgcolor=""|2
|11.8
|1
|14.8
|1
|colspan=2 
|4
|- class="unsortable" class="sortbottom"
!align="left"| Total
!
!17
!
!1
!
!1
!n/a
!1
!
!2
!22
|}

Notes

Ward results

North Isles

Shetland North

Shetland West

Shetland Central

Lerwick North and Bressay

Lerwick South

Shetland South

Aftermath
Following the election, independent councillors Andrea Manson and Emma MacDonald were elected as the council's convener and political leader, the first time either position had been held by women.

A by-election was called shortly after the election in North Isles ward due to the lack of nominations received at the full election of the council. The by-election was held on 4 August 2022.  Two of the declared candidates, Stewart Douglas and Marie Williamson, stood unsuccessfully in other wards (Shetland South and Lerwick North & Bressay respectively) during the full election.  The by-election was won by Robert Thomson.

John Leask stood down from the Shetland West ward in August 2022, triggering a second by-election.

References

Shetland Islands Council elections
Shetland
21st century in Shetland